N-Ethyl-2C-B is a recreational designer drug with psychedelic effects. It was first synthesised in the 1990s, and was first identified as a new psychoactive substance in Finland in 2007. It is specifically listed as an illegal drug in Finland, and controlled under analogue provisions in a number of other jurisdictions.

See also 
 25B-NBF
 25B-NBOH
 25B-NBOMe
 βk-2C-B
 N-Benzyl-2C-B

References 

Bromoarenes
Designer drugs
Psychedelic phenethylamines
Serotonin receptor agonists
Methoxy compounds
Ethyleneamines
Secondary amines
Substances discovered in the 1990s